It was the sixth season of the Vietnam Futsal League, the Vietnam professional futsal league for association football clubs.

First stage

Group A

Group B

Second stage

References

External links
Official Page

2